The Rosenbauer Simba is an airport fire truck from the Austrian manufacturer Rosenbauer International AG.

Models:
 Simba 6×6
 Simba 8×8

References

See also 
 Rosenbauer Panther

Fire service vehicles
Trucks